The ancient Egyptian Incense burner: arm is a horizontal hieroglyph representing various types of horizontal tools used to offer, and burn incense. In tomb scenes it is often shown with an attached small box, or cup region, for holding incense, located on the upper surface; the offering individual is sometimes holding a grain-pellet of incense, with lines of incense, or connected grains-in-a-line equal to wafting smoke.

Incense was used from the beginning dynasties of Ancient Egypt.

The horizontal incense burner is a determinative in Egyptian language k3p, for "incense, to make smoke". The phonetic value of the hieroglyph is kp.

Incense burner: pot

The other common type of hieroglyph for the burning of incense, is a small pot, with a flame, flickering from the top surface, "Incense burner: pot with smoke". The censer pot has one major usage in front of the feet of the "Soul" bird, the Ibis, :R7-G25 but is also replaced in rare instances with a meteor hieroglyph, :D12-G25, (not Gardiner listed).

See also

Incense burner: pot (hieroglyph)
Gardiner's Sign List#R. Temple Furniture and Sacred Emblems
List of Egyptian hieroglyphs

References

Betrò, Maria Carmela.  Hieroglyphics: The Writings of Ancient Egypt, c. 1995, 1996-(English), Abbeville Press Publishers, New York, London, Paris (hardcover)

Egyptian hieroglyphs: temple furniture and emblems
Incense equipment